An autonomous oblast is an autonomous entity within the state which is on the oblast (province) level of the overall administrative subdivision. It may refer to:

Autonomous oblast of Russia
Jewish Autonomous Oblast
Autonomous oblasts of the Soviet Union
Eastern Rumelia (referred by this name in Bulgarian, one of its official languages)
Serb Autonomous Regions

Types of administrative division